Eois fragilis is a moth in the family Geometridae. It is found in Colombia.

Adults have a monochrome, greyish-brownish appearance.

The larvae feed on Piper species.

References

Moths described in 1900
Eois
Moths of South America